Ľubomír Pištek (born 7 August 1980) is a former Slovak professional ice hockey player who played in the Slovak Extraliga and Czech Extraliga. He was selected by the Philadelphia Flyers in the 8th round (222nd overall) of the 1998 NHL Entry Draft. He played six seasons with HC Slovan Bratislava.

Career statistics

References

External links

1980 births
HC Oceláři Třinec players
HC Dynamo Pardubice players
HC Slovan Bratislava players
HC Vítkovice players
PSG Berani Zlín players
HK Nitra players
Kelowna Rockets players
Living people
Ice hockey people from Bratislava
Philadelphia Flyers draft picks
Saskatoon Blades players
Slovak ice hockey right wingers
VHK Vsetín players
Slovak expatriate ice hockey players in Canada
Slovak expatriate ice hockey players in the Czech Republic